Dries Wuytens (born 18 March 1991) is a Belgian professional footballer who plays as a centre-back for Beveren in the Belgian First Division B.

Career statistics

Honours

Club
Willem II
Eerste Divisie (1): 2013–14

References

External links
 
 
 

1991 births
Living people
Belgian footballers
Beerschot A.C. players
Willem II (football club) players
Heracles Almelo players
Sparta Rotterdam players
Sektzia Ness Ziona F.C. players
S.K. Beveren players
Belgian Pro League players
Challenger Pro League players
Eredivisie players
Eerste Divisie players
Israeli Premier League players
Belgian expatriate footballers
Expatriate footballers in the Netherlands
Expatriate footballers in Israel
Belgian expatriate sportspeople in the Netherlands
Belgian expatriate sportspeople in Israel
Association football defenders